Air Commodore John Henry Peyto Verney, 20th Baron Willoughby de Broke, MC, AFC (21 May 1896, London – 25 May 1986) was a British peer.

Background and education
The son of Richard Verney, 19th Baron Willoughby de Broke, and Marie Frances Lisette Hanbury, Verney was educated at Eton and the Royal Military College, Sandhurst. He succeeded his father in 1923.

Military career
During the First World War, he was awarded the Military Cross (1918). At the end of hostilities, he became aide-de-camp to the Governor of Bombay, Sir George Lloyd, from 1919 to 1922 and adjutant of the Warwickshire Yeomanry from 1925 to 1929. In 1939 he was appointed Lord Lieutenant of Warwickshire, a post he held until 1967. Between the wars both Lord and Lady Willoughby were keen aviators with their own aeroplane and private aerodrome at their home in Kineton, Warwickshire. He was also Commanding Officer from 1936–1939 of the 605 County of Warwick squadron.

During the Second World War, he was a Duty Controller in the No. 11 Group Operations Room at RAF Uxbridge, responsible for the fighter protection of the south-east (when he was mentioned in despatches) and then became Deputy Director of Public Relations at the Air Ministry (1941–44) and Director from 1945-46.

Other

Joint Master of the Warwickshire Hounds (1929–35) and chairman of the Wolverhampton Racecourse Company (1947–71), he was also President of the Hunters' Improvement Society (1957–58).

Family
On 4 October 1933 Lord Willoughby de Broke married Rachel Wrey, daughter of Sir (Robert) Bourchier Sherard Wrey, 11th Baronet (1855-1917) of Tawstock in Devon and Lutterworth in Leicestershire. They had two children:
David Verney, 21st Baron Willoughby de Broke (born 1938)
The Honourable Susan Geraldine Verney (born 1942).

References

Citations

Bibliography
 Crozier, Hazel. (2007) RAF Uxbridge 90th Anniversary 1917 – 2007. RAF High Wycombe: Air Command Media Services
 The Birmingham Post Year Book and Who's Who 1973–74, Birmingham Post and Mail Ltd., July 1973

External links
 Imperial War Museum Interview

1896 births
1986 deaths
Lord-Lieutenants of Warwickshire
People educated at Eton College
Recipients of the Air Force Cross (United Kingdom)
Recipients of the Military Cross
Royal Air Force officers
Warwickshire Yeomanry officers
Graduates of the Royal Military College, Sandhurst
John
20
Royal Air Force personnel of World War II
British Army personnel of World War I
7th Queen's Own Hussars officers
Green Howards officers
20th-century English nobility